Weert is a railway station in Weert, Netherlands. The station is on the Eindhoven–Weert railway, Weert–Roermond railway and the Iron Rhine (Antwerp - Mönchengladbach). It was opened in 1879, the current building was built in 1913. The train services are operated by Nederlandse Spoorwegen.

Train services
The following services call at Weert:
2x per hour intercity services (Schagen -) Alkmaar - Amsterdam - Utrecht - Eindhoven - Maastricht
2x per hour intercity services Amsterdam Airport Schiphol - Utrecht - Eindhoven - Heerlen
2x per hour local services (sprinter) Eindhoven - Weert

External links
NS website
Dutch Public Transport journey planner

Railway stations in Limburg (Netherlands)
Railway stations opened in 1913
1913 establishments in the Netherlands
Buildings and structures in Weert
Transport in Weert
Railway stations in the Netherlands opened in the 20th century